The Ogden Regional Medical Center is a hospital in Ogden, Utah.

Overview
Ogden Regional has 239 licensed beds, 300 physician medical staff, 1,000 employees & volunteers, with 77,000 outpatient visits per year and 7,500 annual inpatient admissions. Annually, it performs 10,000 surgeries, processes 25,000 units of blood and performs 2,500 deliveries. It is accredited by the Joint Commission on Accreditation of Healthcare Organizations (JCAHO) and is a Level II trauma center verified by the American College of Surgeons.

History

A group of Sisters of the Order of St. Benedict traveled to the foothills east of Ogden, Utah, and founded the first St. Benedict's Hospital at 3000 Polk, which opened on September 18, 1946. Their own philosophy, “caring for the sick as if they were Christ in person,” is taken from the Rule of St. Benedict by which the Sisters lived.

Due to expansion, a new hospital in Washington Terrace was dedicated in 1977. These buildings housed numerous hospital programs while providing convenient office space for many physicians and related health care activities.

In July 1977, the Val A. Browning Radiation Therapy Center, now called the Val A. Browning Cancer Treatment Center, opened its doors to treat cancer patients from throughout Northern Utah and surrounding states. As a result, St. Benedict's helped organize the Hospice of Northern Utah for terminally ill patients and their relatives.

On Mother's Day, 1992, they opened a new Women's and Children's Center, which also housed OB/GYN and pediatric physician offices. A new neonatal intensive care unit had opened previously in November 1987.

To further strengthen its cardiology program, the cardiac catheterization lab was upgraded, allowing the hospital to implement its nationally rated open-heart surgery program.

St. Benedict's has been affiliated with various organizations. Since 1995, the hospital, now called Ogden Regional Medical Center, has been part of what is now Hospital Corporation of America (HCA). In May 2000, Ogden Regional Medical Center joined with five other HCA-affiliated hospitals in Utah to announce a new network named MountainStar Healthcare.

References

Hospital buildings completed in 1946
Hospital buildings completed in 1977
Hospitals in Utah
Buildings and structures in Weber County, Utah
MountainStar Healthcare
Hospitals established in 1946
HCA Healthcare
Trauma centers